The Harney Basin is an endorheic basin in southeastern Oregon in the United States at the northwestern corner of the Great Basin. One of the least populated areas of the contiguous United States, it is located largely in northern Harney County, bounded on the north and east by the Columbia Plateau—within which it is contained, physiographically speaking—and on the south and west by a volcanic plain. Malheur Lake is a freshwater lake, while Harney Lake is saline-alkaline.

The basin is bounded on the north by the southern end of the Blue Mountains. The ridge of Steens Mountain separates the basin from the watershed of the Alvord Desert to the southeast. No streams cross the volcanic plains that separate the basin from the watershed of the Klamath River to the southwest.  The basin includes archeological sites of the Drewsey Resource Area.

Geography

The center of the basin is flat and contains Malheur and Harney lakes, which receive the streams originating within the basin in the surrounding mountains, including the Silvies River from the north and the Donner und Blitzen River from the south. Harney Lake is the actual sink of the basin, connected in some years to Malheur Lake but currently separated by constantly changing sand dunes. Both lakes cycle between open water in wetter years and marshes in drier years. The wetlands around Malheur Lake and Harney Lake form a wetlands oasis in the basin, providing a habitat for many migratory bird species, including 2.5 million ducks each year. Malheur Lake and its surroundings are embraced by Malheur National Wildlife Refuge.

Harney County, Oregon, had a total population of 7,422 at the 2010 census, and Burns in the plain north of Malheur Lake is the only community with a population larger than 1,000. Dryland ranching is the basis of the area's economy, with relatively little irrigation water available from the streams that enter Malheur Lake.

Harney Basin Volcanic Field
The Harney Basin Volcanic Field is a series of volcanic flows of rhyolite and of tuffs of ash flows in around Burns, Oregon.  The field is within the High Lava Plains Province.

Harney-Malheur Lakes watershed
The Harney-Malheur Lakes watershed is a  Great Basin watershed.  The adjacent Donner und Blitzen River watershed of  discharges into Malheur Lake and includes the river portion of the  Malheur National Wildlife Refuge.  "Alkali Field is located directly south of Malheur Lake, a few kilometers east of the Donner und Blitzen River."

History
 
The basin was formed approximately 32,000 years ago when lava flows formed the Malheur Gap, separating the watershed of the basin from the Malheur River, a tributary of the Snake River. Archaeological evidence indicates the basin was inhabited as early as 10,000 years ago. Pollen records indicate that the climate, especially the level of rain and snowfall, has varied greatly since the end of the Pleistocene. Evidence of prehistoric fishing techniques is found at several sites. Evidence suggests that there existed in the basin several species—in particular, the chiselmouth, coarse-scale suckers, and northern squawfish—that are currently found only in the Columbia River basin, indicating that at some point the Harney Basin may have been connected to the Columbia. In modern times, however, the lake level does not rise above  in the wettest years.

In the 19th century, the basin was inhabited by the Northern Paiute tribe. It was explored and extensively trapped by trappers of the Hudson's Bay Company in the 1820s. The basin lay far off the route of the Oregon Trail, but in 1845 experienced mountain man Stephen Meek led an ill-fated party across the basin via Stinkingwater Pass, seeking a shortcut to The Dalles along what has become known as the Meek Cutoff. A total of 23 people died while the party wandered in the basin until finding water at the Crooked River.

Because of its climate, it received sparse white settlements and was largely left to the Paiute until the late 19th century. Settlement pressures and conflicts with the Paiute in other areas of Oregon caused President Ulysses S. Grant in 1872 to create a reservation for the Paiute encompassing Malheur Lake and much of the basin. Growing settlement pressures, in particular the discovery of gold in the surrounding mountains, as well as the interest of white settlers to form ranches in the region, caused the Commissioner of Indian Affairs to abruptly terminate the reservation in 1879. The Northern Paiute would survive virtually landless until obtaining tracts of land near Burns in 1935.

The basin has a widespread decline in groundwater which has put the region at risk of ecological and economic collapse. Irrigation pumping is dropping the water table as much as  every year in one area.

See also
 Oregon Outback

References

External links
 USFWS: Archaeology in the Malheur National Wildlife Refuge
 Oregon Magazine: Harney Basin
 John Day Fossil Beds: History

Archaeological sites in Oregon
Structural basins of the United States
Geography of Harney County, Oregon